The insurgency in Cabo Delgado is an ongoing Islamist insurgency in Cabo Delgado Province, Mozambique, mainly fought between militant Islamists and jihadists attempting to establish an Islamic state in the region, and Mozambican security forces. Civilians have been the main targets of terrorist attacks by Islamist militants. The main insurgent faction is Ansar al-Sunna, a native extremist faction with tenuous international connections. From mid-2018, the Islamic State's Central Africa Province has allegedly become active in northern Mozambique as well, and claimed its first attack against Mozambican security forces in June 2019. In addition, bandits have exploited the rebellion to carry out raids. As of 2020, the insurgency intensified, as in the first half of 2020 there were nearly as many attacks carried out as in the whole of 2019.

Ansar al-Sunna (English: "Supporters of the Tradition") is similar to the name of an Iraqi Sunni insurgent group that fought against U.S. troops between 2003 and 2007. They are known locally as al-Shabaab but they are not formally related to the better known Somali al-Shabaab, although both pledge their allegiance to the militant group Islamic State (ISIL). Some of the militants are known to speak Portuguese, the official language of Mozambique, however others speak Kimwane, the local language, and Swahili, the lingua franca language spoken north of that area in the Great Lakes region. Reports also state that members are allegedly mostly Mozambicans from Mocimboa da Praia, Palma, and Macomia districts, but also include foreign nationals from Tanzania and Somalia.

Background
Ansar al-Sunna, also known by its original name Ahlu Sunnah Wa-Jamo (translated: "adepts of the prophetic tradition"), was initially an Islamic religious movement in the northern districts of Cabo Delgado which first appeared around 2015. It was formed by followers of the radical Kenyan cleric Aboud Rogo, who was killed in 2012. Thereafter, some members of his movement settled down in Kibiti, Tanzania, before moving into Mozambique.

Ansar al-Sunna claims that Islam as practised in Mozambique has been corrupted and no longer follows the teachings of Muhammad. The movement's members consequently entered traditional mosques with weapons in order to threaten others to follow their own radical beliefs. The movement is also anti-Christian, anti-Animist, and anti-Western, and has tried to prevent people from attending hospitals or schools which it considers secular and anti-Islamic. This behavior alienated much of the local population instead of converting them to Ahlu Sunnah Wa-Jamo, so that the movement's members broke away and formed their own places of worship. Over time, the group became increasingly violent: It called an extreme form of Sharia to be implemented in the country, no longer recognized the Mozambican government, and started to form hidden camps in Macomia District, Mocímboa da Praia District, and Montepuez District. There, Ansar al-Sunna militants were trained by ex-policemen, and ex-frontier guards who had been fired and held grudges against the government. The movement also contacted other Islamist militants in East Africa, and reportedly hired trainers from Somalia, Tanzania, and Kenya. Some of the Ansar al-Sunna militants have also journeyed abroad to receive direct training by other militant groups.

The militants are not unified, but split into different cells which do not appear to coordinate their actions. By August 2018, the Mozambican police had identified six men as leaders of the militants in Cabo Delgado: Abdul Faizal, Abdul Raim, Abdul Remane, Ibn Omar, "Salimo", and Nuno Remane. Ansar al-Sunna funds itself through drug trafficking (primarily heroin), contraband, and ivory trade.

While religion does play a fundamental role in the conflict, analysts believe the most important factors in the insurgency are widespread social, economic, and political problems in Mozambique. Unemployment and especially youth unemployment are considered the main causes for locals to join the Islamist rebels. Increasing inequalities have led many young people to be easily attracted by such a radical movement, as Ansar al-Sunna promises that its form of Islam will act as "antidote" to the existing "corrupt, elitist rule". Most rebels belong to the Mwani and Makwa ethnic groups that are native to Cabo Delgado; civilians belonging to these peoples have expressed sympathy for the insurgents. In general, the province lacks infrastructure and the state is underrepresented, easing the spread of the insurgency.

Timeline

2017
 On 5 October, a pre-dawn raid targeted 3 police stations in the town of Mocímboa da Praia. It was led by 30 armed members, who killed 17 people, including two police officers and a community leader. 14 of the perpetrators were captured. During this brief occupation of Mocímboa da Praia, the perpetrators stole firearms and ammunition and told residents that they reject state health and education, and refused to pay taxes. The group is said to be affiliated with Al-Shabaab, the Al Qaeda-affiliated Islamist extremist group situated and operating in mostly the southern regions of Somalia.
 On 10 October, police detained 52 suspects in relation to the attack on 5 October.
As a result, many locals fled the village.
 On 27 October 2017, the Mozambican police confirmed the arrest of 100 more members of the group, including foreigners, in relation to the attack on 5 October.
 On 24 November, in the northern Mozambican province of Cabo Delgado, the government ordered the closure of three mosques located in Pemba and in the neighbourhoods of Cariaco, Alto Gigone and Chiuba, which were believed to have a connection with Islamic fundamentalism.
 On 29 November, the group attacked the villages of Mitumbate and Maculo, injuring two and killing at least two people. The two deaths were by decapitation and death by burning. According to local authorities, the terrorists also destroyed a church and 27 homes.
 On 4 December, the district government of Moçímboa da Praia in northern Mozambique named two men, Nuro Adremane and Jafar Alawi, as suspected of organising the attacks by an armed group against the police in October. Both men were Mozambican nationals. The district government stated that both men studied Islam in Tanzania, Sudan and Saudi Arabia, where they allegedly also received military training.
 On 17 December, a successful assassination attempt was committed on the National Director of Reconnaissance of the Police Rapid Intervention Unit.
 On 26 December, Police Spokesman Inacio Dino announced the commencement of counter-insurgency operations in the forests surrounding Mutumbate, in Cabo Delgado province. Since the amnesty for surrendering expired, stated that 36 Tanzanian citizens would be targeted by the operations.
 On 29 December, the independent Mozambican newspaper "O Pais" reported that Mozambican paratroopers and marines attacked the village of Mitumbate via air and sea, regarding it as a stronghold for the insurgents. The aftermath of the attack left 50 dead, including women and children, and an unknown number injured.

2018
 On 3 January, Mozambican police announced that the attacks on 29 December were classified as acts of terrorism.
 On 13 January, a group of terrorists entered the town of Olumbi in the Palma district around 8pm and fired into a market and a government administrative building, killing 5.
 On 28 January, a video appeared on social media showing six Islamist extremists dressed in civilian clothing and appealing to Mozambicans to join them in the fight for the values of Islamic doctrine and to establish Islamic law. The video was in both Portuguese and Arabic.
 On 12 March, Radio Moçambique reported that an armed group attacked the village of Chitolo, burning down 50 homes and killing residents in the process.
 On 21 March, residents of the village of Manilha abandoned their homes after witnessing armed men carrying out attacks in the surrounding area on the banks of the river Quinhevo.
 On 20, 21 and 22 April the group attacked the villages of Diaca Velha, near the boundary with Nangade district as well as the village of Mangwaza in the Palma district. Looting houses, burning four houses and killing one person and taking three hostages. However pursuit operations were launched on 22 April by Mozambican security personnel capturing 30 jihadist in the process. Meanwhile, a South African newspaper reported that about 90 militants belonging to the Islamic State of Iraq and the Levant had infiltrated northern Mozambique, citing unnamed intelligence sources. The Mozambican government promptly denied this report as baseless. Nevertheless, the Africa Union reported in May that it had confirmed the presence of ISIL forces in Mozambique.
 On 27 May, ten people, including children, were beheaded in the village of Monjane in the Palma district of Cabo Delgado province. Locals attribute the violence to al-Shabab, a terrorist group founded in 2015 (no relation to the Somali terrorist group al-Shabab). Twelve days later, the U.S. Embassy in Mozambique warned American citizens to leave the district headquarters of Palma, citing a risk of another imminent attack.
 On 3 June, five civilians were decapitated in an attack on the village of Rueia in the Macomia district.
 On 5 June, six men armed with machetes and guns killed seven people and injured four others and set dozens of homes on fire in the village of Naunde in the Macomia district.
 On 6 June, at least six people were killed and two seriously injured when terrorists armed with knives and machetes attacked the village of Namaluco in the Quissanga district. The assailants also burned down a hundred houses.
 On 11 June, terrorists armed with machetes and firearms attacked the village of Changa in the Nangade district in the northern Mozambican province of Cabo Delgado, killing four people. The attackers also burned down several houses.
 On 12 June,a group of armed men attacked the village of Nathuko in the Macomia district in the Mozambican province of Cabo Delgado. The terrorists decapitated a villager, burned down several houses and killed all the animals.
 On 21 September, 12 people were killed, 15 injured, and 55 houses were burned by jihadists in the village of Paqueue in the province of Cabo Delgado. 10 of the victims were shot to death and 2 were burned to death, with at least one of the victims being decapitated post-mortum.
 On 3 November, suspected Ansar al Sunna insurgents looted houses and set on fire at least 45 houses in an isolated village in the Macomia District, no casualties were reported in the incident.
 On 7 December 30-year-old Mustafa Suale Machinga was captured by local residents and referred to authorities in Litingina village in Nangade District in Mozambique's Cabo Delgado province. Machinga a former member of the Mozambican armed forces was captured after being accused by residents of leading the group responsible for Islamist militant-inspired attacks in the zone.

2019 

 Sometime in January or early February 2019, security forces captured Abdul Rahmin Faizal, a suspected insurgent leader of Ugandan nationality.
 On 8 February, Islamist fighters attacked Piqueue village in Cabo Delgado, killing and dismembering seven men, and kidnapping four women.
 After Cyclone Kenneth hit Mozambique on 25 April, resulting in much devastation, the rebels initially halted their attacks. On 3 May, however, they struck once again by destroying the village of Nacate, Macomia District, killing six civilians. In the following weeks, the Islamists increased their attacks, raiding and burning several villages such as Ntapuala and Banga-Vieja in Macomia District, as well as Ida and Ipho in Meluco District. They also carried out ambushes, and told locals to abandon their homes. At least two attacks targeted workers of Anadarko Petroleum, a United States-headquartered hydrocarbon exploration company.
 On 4 June, ISIL claimed that its "Central Africa Province" branch had carried out a successful attack on the Mozambican Army at Mitopy in the Mocímboa da Praia District. At least 16 people were killed and about 12 wounded during the attack. By this point, ISIL considered Ansar al-Sunna as one its affiliates, though how many Islamist rebels in Mozambique are actually loyal to ISIL remains unclear.
 On 3 July, an attack by Islamists in Nangade District killed seven people, including civilians and a policeman. On 6 July ISIL claimed responsibility for the attack.
 On 25 September, Russian military hardware, namely two Mi-17 helicopters, was delivered via a Russian Air Force An-124 (registration RA-82038) transport aeroplane which landed at Nacala. The Russian and Mozambican governments had previously signed an agreement on military and technical cooperation in late January 2017.
 In early October, the Mozambican military launched several counter-insurgency operations with the support of Russian mercenaries and defense contractors from the Wagner Group. The rebels were pushed back in many areas of Cabo Delgado, and forced to retreat into the woods. In addition, 34 individuals were detained while traveling from Nampula to Cabo Delgado in order to join the ISIL-affiliated insurgent group. The rebels retaliated by killing seven Russian mercenaries as well as 20 Mozambican soldiers during two ambushes. The attacks were attributed to the Islamic State's Central Africa Province.
 In November, a number of government troops and 5 fighters from the Wagner Group were killed in an ambush, with ISIL claiming responsibility for the attack.

2020 
 23 March: Mocímboa da Praia was captured by Islamist militants in a coordinated attack from land and sea. The rebels destroyed government buildings and raised a Jihadist flag, but refrained from targeting civilians. Instead, the insurgents distributed food and looted goods to the locals, and withdrew from the city later that day.
 25 March: rebels raided the capital of Quissanga District, followed by several more villages.
 7 April: militants killed 52 villagers in Xitaxi village, who refused to join them. Islamic State's Central Africa Province was regarded as responsible for the massacre. On the same day, Mozambican security forces reportedly killed 39 militants during an attempted attack on Muidumbe village. Meanwhile, several local rebels declared their intention to establish a caliphate in northern Mozambique.
 10 April: security forces allegedly killed 59 rebels during a clash on the Quirimbas Islands.
 11–13 April: Mozambican security forces reportedly killed 31 insurgents during operations on Ibo island.
 24 April: the Mozambican government admitted for the first time that Islamic State followers were active in the country and involved in the insurgency.
 14 May: Mozambican Interior Minister Amade Miquidade claims that the government forces had killed 50 insurgents in separate incidents in the northern part of Cabo Delgado Province.
 28 May: around 90 Islamist fighters attacked the town of Macomia and raised the black standard flag.
 By June: South African SANDF special forces had become active in Mozambique, assisting local security forces against the local rebels.
 1 June: Government forces recaptured Macomia killing two jihadist leaders.
 27 June: Mocímboa da Praia was again captured by Islamist militants, with IS-CAP claiming to be responsible. Many local civilians consequently fled the town. On the same day, other rebels ambushed workers belonging to Fenix Constructions Service Lda, a private construction firm subcontracted by oil and gas company Total S.A., killing at least eight employees.
 30 June: Government forces recaptured Mocímboa da Praia.
 25 July: Islamic State-aligned militants killed two civilians in Chai village near Macomia.
 26 July: Government forces recaptured Chai.
 9 August: Insurgents captured Awasse.
 11 August: ISCAP rebels once again took control of Mocímboa da Praia after a several days-long offensive which resulted in the death of over one hundred Mozambican troops.
 13 August: A refugee ship coming from Nkomangano was shot at by Government forces sinking it killing 40 civilians.
 8 September: Insurgents captured two islands, Mecungo and Vamizi, killing one person. The rebels evicted all locals from the islands, and declared them part of their territory. In addition, the ISIL forces declared Mocímboa da Praia the capital of their province.
 24 September: Mozambican soldiers repelled an insurgent attack against the village of Bilibiza.
 26 September: Mozambique requests assistance from the European Union (EU) in combating the insurgency.
 26 September: Mozambique claims to be in control of Mocimboa da Praia, despite not having a physical presence in the city. In addition, the tourist island of Vamizi is reported to have been recaptured by Mozambican forces, and 50 soldiers are reportedly stationed there.
 29 September: Mozambican authorities report that four insurgent attacks were launched against the villages of Chai, Mucojo, Bilibiza, and Cagembe, killing over a dozen people. The militants also attacked a security post in Naliendele, killing several civilians and two Mozambican soldiers.
 30 September: The United States reportedly requests Zimbabwe to assist Mozambique in combating the insurgency in Cabo Delgado, despite having previously imposed sanctions.
 30 September – 6 October: Insurgents took control of Mucojo administrative post and several villages. Local population fled.

 14 October: In the first heavy attack outside Mozambique by local terrorists, hundreds of Islamic State and Ansar-al-Sunna members attack a village in Mtwara, Tanzania, killing 20 civilians and damaging properties.
 15–17 October: Mozambican security forces claim to have recaptured the region of Awasse and killed over 270 ISCAP insurgents without suffering any casualties of their own. Seven truckloads of weaponry as well as several militants were reported captured. However no proof has been provided and this claim has been disputed by others.
 22 October: The EU agrees to assist Mozambique in combating the insurgency in Cabo Delgado.
 28 October: The Mozambican government reports that the army has captured several insurgent hideouts in the woods and are advancing on a major insurgent base, nicknamed "Syria", in Cabo Delgado.
 30 October: A refugee ship carrying 74 refugees capsized near Ilha Makalowe killing 54 people.
 1 November: Islamists captured Muidumbe.
 6 November: Militants are reported to have beheaded over 50 people in an attack on Muatide village.
 11 November: Local media in Mozambique reports that Islamist rebels captured nine towns over the previous two weeks. They were also advancing on the strategically significant town of Mueda.
 12 November: Mozambican authorities detain 12 Iraqi nationals for supposed links to Islamist insurgents after discovering numerous weapons and other equipment in their possession.
 14 November: The United Nations Human Rights Commissioner, Michelle Bachelet, calls for an international response to the Cabo Delgado insurgency.
 17 November: ISIL insurgents reportedly threatened to attack the town of Mueda, warning all residents to evacuate the area by 20 November. In addition, the UN's migration agency reports that 33,000 people have been displaced in just one week due to the insurgency.
 19 November: Over 1,000 Mozambican troops recaptured Muidumbe District, killing 16 militants.
 22 November: Mozambique and Tanzania announce the launch of a joint military operation against Islamic insurgents in Cabo Delgado.
 26 November: Insurgents once again captured Namacande, Muidumbe district capital, and Muatide.
 2 December: President Nyusi meets with several US counter-terrorism officials to discuss combating the insurgency in Cabo Delgado
 3 December: Malawi's president announces that troops from the Malawian Defence Force will be sent to Mozambique to assist in anti-insurgent operations.
 4 December: Militants ambush a convoy of Mozambican troops in the village of Muidumbe, killing 25 soldiers in an intense firefight before retreating into the woods.
 8 December: Government forces have claimed to have recaptured Quissanga village.
 12 December: Insurgents went on a shooting spree through Nangade district. Traveling by motorbike, the attackers killed 14 civilians and destroyed four vehicles across the villages of Namiune, 25 de Setembro, Naleke, Chicuaia Nova, Litingina, and Lukuamba.
 15 December: Government forces attacked Awasse but were forced to retreat by insurgents.
 29 December: ISCAP militants attacked the village of Monjane, forcing the local population to flee the area.

2021 

 7 January: ISCAP militants attacked the coastal village of Olumboa, Macomia district. There, they captured 13 civilians. Of those captured, two escaped and at least seven were beheaded by the insurgents.
 16 January: A football team travelling from Mueda to Palma were ambushed by insurgents, leaving 5 people dead. On the same day, government forces launched an offensive operation in Ntuleni, Palma district, killing an unknown number of insurgents, who were also using civilians as human shields.
 19 January: Insurgents attacked a vehicle transporting cans of gasoline to Palma as it made its way through Pundanhar, Palma district. Some passengers managed to flee. Insurgents killed three civilians and burned the car.
 21 January: A small group of insurgents raided the village of Namiune, Nangade district. They beat and then beheaded a village leader and kidnapped four boys aged between 10 and 12.
 Also on 21 January: IS insurgents attacked the town of Mandimba, occupying the town until 26 January. Whilst in the town, insurgents reportedly killed 1 civilian and 2 policemen in addition to looting the town. During the occupation, militants killed 3 civilians the town of Namiune.
 30 January: On 30 January, militants attacked the village of Nkonga, Nangade district, just west of the border with Mocimboa da Praia. No casualties have yet been reported from the attack, but insurgents stole food and burned homes in the village. Insurgents also returned the next day and renewed their assault.
 Unknown date(Late January): There were clashes between government-backed militias and IS militants in Panjele, Mocimboa da Praia district, leading to the deaths of 3 government-backed militiamen and an unknown number of insurgents.
 In mid February: state newspaper Notícias reported that only 6,294 young people from Cabo Delgado have been conscripted into the military in the current conscription period, which runs from the beginning of January to the end of February. The military's target was to sign up 14,952 new soldiers from the province.
 19 February: insurgents attacked the village of Quionga in northern Palma district near the Tanzanian border. According to a source quoted by Pinnacle News, 30 insurgents were involved in the attack and the raiders remained in the town until the next morning. Insurgents killed four people in Quionga, burned homes — including that of the head of the Quionga administrative post — and looted food in the village.
 22 February: Militants attacked Ingalonga, Nangade district, beheading at least 2 people. On the same day, insurgents also attacked Mitope, Mocimboa da Praia district, beheading 3 men and taking 3 women hostage, one of which was later released.
 25 February: insurgents attacked the village of Luneque, Nangade district, killing at least 4 civilians and forcing several others to flee.
 26 February: insurgents attacked Quirinde, Palma district, killing 7 people, 3 of which were beheaded.
 1 March: insurgents began to set up road blocks between Nangade and Mueda. Insurgents also killed 2 civilian farmers near the village of Eduardo Mondlane, east of Litingina.
 3 March: insurgents ambushed a military vehicle travelling from Nangade to Mueda. The attack left one lieutenant colonel dead and two other Mozambican soldiers dead. Insurgents also raided the village of N'gangolo, killing 2 civilians.
 10 March: 8 insurgents were killed by Mozambican militia in Nangade district.
 16 March: Save The Children has reported that children as young as 11 have been beheaded.
 In mid March: The town of Palma is effectively besieged by insurgents via cutting off supply lines most notably food supplies. Mozambican authorities used air transport to fly in supplies to the town.
 In late March: The United States deployed the Green Berets special forces to train the Mozambican marines.
 Since 24 March, ISIL militants conducted a major attack on the town of Palma, following a loss of communication from the town. Militants first attacked the police station and then proceeded to rob the town's banks. A military source in Palma claimed 'government forces resisted but then had to flee' as the militants were using 'heavy weapons that they had not seen before'. Residential buildings were attacked too, resulting in the death of many civilians. On 27 March, the fourth day of the siege in the town, several more people were killed by the terrorists. Civilians were killed in the streets and in their houses; some of the victims were beheaded. A gas project was attacked too, and workers were murdered. About 200 foreign nationals fled to a local hotel to protect themselves, but the place was assaulted by the militants. A convoy conducted by Mozambican soldiers arrived at the scene to rescue the foreigners, but it came under fire. A South African man and a British civil contractor were confirmed killed in that attack, alongside 21 responding soldiers and several more people whose identity is unknown so far.

 5 April: Mozambican forces recapture Palma, though most of the town is destroyed in the fighting. Insurgents still remain in the outskirts and fighting still continues.
 8 April: Seven insurgents entered the village of Novo Cabo Delgado, in northwestern Macomia district. They looted food and other goods from the village. As they left, they were ambushed by members of a local militia. In the ensuing firefight, militia members killed three insurgents. One militia member was killed and another wounded.
 11 April: A displaced civilian was found beheaded in his house in Palma, after discovering a large cache of food the previous day.
 19 April: Civilians discovered the bodies of 3 young men in Palma, addressing they'd been killed by Mozambican troops who were sweeping the town for insurgents.
 22 April: A taxi driver was killed by Mozambican soldiers in Pemba after a misunderstanding that led the soldiers to believe the taxi driver was an insurgent.
 23 April: 5 civilians were killed and 7 homes were burned down after insurgents attacked a district of Palma.
 30 April: Reports of fresh clashes between Mozambican troops and insurgents in Palma began to surface after insurgents burnt more buildings in the town, in the days prior, in an attempt to force Mozambican troops out. The phone service was once again cut off from the town, making communication difficult. Insurgents were also spotted in Quiuia, north of Palma. On the same day, 5 fisherman were beheaded by insurgents near the town of Pangane.
 3 May: 7 displaced civilians from Palma were killed and several more were killed after insurgents sunk two boats carrying displaced people off the coast of Ilha Mucongwe.
 7 May: 5 insurgents were killed by a local militia after insurgents launched a failed attack on Ngalonga, in southeastern Nangade district.
 15 May: Insurgents in Quifula Island in the Quirimba Islands (Ibo, Cabo Delgado) killed a fisherman.
 21 May: Government forces reportedly recaptured Diaca and Namacunde.
 22 May: There was fighting between government forces and insurgents in lower Palma, insurgents burned down 14 homes and a mosque in lower Palma. There has been no confirmation on casualties.
 4 June: Government forces repelled insurgent attack on Namacunde.
 12 June: A group of self-appointed vigilantes tried to confront some remaining insurgents with machetes in north Palma. Upon reaching the insurgents, 3 of the vigilantes were shot dead.
 12 June: 7 civilians were beheaded in the fields outside the village of Litamanda, in northern Macomia district. Local militia stated Mozambican troops were responsible after Mozambican soldiers were seen with blood on their clothes nearby. The militia also stated they looted the civilians' property and beheaded them to make it look like it was the result of an insurgent attack.
 15 June: 7 dead civilians were discovered near Novo Cabo Delgado, Macomia district. It is unclear who it was that killed them.
 16 June: IS militants asked for a ransom of 1 million US dollars for the safe return of Indian citizen and businessman, Vinod Beniwal, who was abducted by IS during the Battle of Palma, in March 2021.
 17 June: Mozambican troops raided the village of Quitunda, just south of Palma. The troops ransacked the town and looted property of civilians.
 19 June: Insurgents attacked the village of Nova Cabo Delgado, looting the village and killing 8 civilians. Once they left the town, they were ambushed by a local militia. 5 insurgents were killed in the shootout.
 23 June: ISIS attacked positions of the Mozambican army in Patacua, just south of Quitunda in Palma district. At least one Mozambican soldier was killed and several weapons were captured by the militants. The IS-linked Amaq News Agency claimed the attack resulted in the deaths of 15 Mozambican soldiers.
 Late June: Skirmishes between insurgents and Mozambican forces continued in Palma, forcing Mozambican forces to abandon one of their barracks'.
 2 July: Insurgents attacked the village of Namande, killing 7 civilians and 3 Mozambican militiamen. Also of 2 July, ISIS operatives attacked the town of Diaca, killing one Mozambican policeman and capturing two police armoured personnel carriers.

 10 July: 9 women displaced by the fighting near Palma drowned after their boats capsized near the island of Ilha Vamize.
 13 July: Mozambican troops executed 15 suspected insurgents that had been attempting to cross into Tanzania. It is unclear if the personnel executed were insurgents.
 14 July: ISIS claim an attack on the village of Ncumbi, in which 4 civilians were killed.
 15 July: Insurgents attacked the village of Congresso, north of Macomia town. Six civilians were killed in the attack.
 15 July:  Southern African Development Community deploys the Southern African Development Community Mission in Mozambique (SAMIM) force.
 Mid July: Rwandan troops were now being deployed in Cabo Delagado province amid reports that the Mozambican army was preparing to launch a coastal invasion on the insurgent held areas of the province.
 17 July: Insurgents attacked the village of Mitope, in the northwest of Mocimboa da Praia district. One civilian was beheaded in the attack. On the same day, insurgents attacked the village of Nampanha, Muidumbe district, killing two civilians.
 18 July: ISIL operatives attacked the village of Mandava, engaging with Mozambican militia, killing 2 of them.
 19 July: Insurgents attacked the village of Namande, killing 3 civilians. Two more civilians were also killed in an attack on Nampanha. On the same day, a ship carrying supplies to displaced people in Pemba was shipwrecked on the Mozambican coast, killing 12 civilians.
 20 July: Rwandan troops and insurgents clashed in the village of Quionga, north of Palma. 30 insurgents were allegedly killed in the clashes.
 24 July: Rwandan troops killed 4 insurgents in skirmish in the town of Awasse. Rwandan casualties are unknown.
 26 July: Government forces recaptured Awasse. Three insurgents were reportedly killed and one Rwandan soldier was injured.
 28 July: ISIL claims an attack on Mozambican militia near Nampanha, killing 2 militiamen.
 30 July: Zimbabwe announces they are sending 304 'defence instructors' to help train and provide support for Mozambican troops in the insurgency.
 31 July: ISIL claim an attack on Mozambican positions in Mandava, killing at least one Mozambican army officer. Clashes were also reported to have taken place through to 1 August.
 From July to 4 August, Mozambican and allied forces had captured the settlements of Chinda, Mumu, Mbau, Zambia, Mapalanganha, Maputo, Tete, Njama and Quelimane from insurgents.
 8 August: Rwandan and Mozambican forces retook the city of Mocímboa da Praia, after clashed with a small number of insurgents. Most of the town had been abandoned by insurgents prior to the offensive. Casualties are unknown.
 18 August: Government forces recaptured Marere south of Mocimboa da Praia.
 20 August: Government forces recaptured Mbau, killing 11 militiamen.
 24 August: 10 fishermen were beheaded by insurgents in Mucojo.
 27 August: Government forces occupied insurgent base in Ntchinga in Muidumbe.
 31 August: 3 civilians were killed and dismembered in Quissanga during a suspected insurgent attack.
 12 September: an IED was detonated, targeting a Rwandan military convoy, causing material damage only.
 13 September: clashes between insurgents and Mozambican forces were reported in the Messalo river valley.
 16 September: 5 civilians were killed by insurgents for brewing alcohol in Namaluco, Quissanga district.
 20 September: Insurgents attacked the villages of Bilibiza, Nacuta, and Tapara, killing at least 17 civilians. 15 insurgents arrived in the village of Kagera, in Tanzania, killing at least one shopkeeper. One source says that 3 civilians were beheaded for failing to recite the Shahada.
 22 September: Mozambican forces attacked an insurgent camp in a rural area near Quiterajo, Macomia district, killing 5 insurgents.
 23 September: 2 buses carrying Mozambican soldiers were attacked, resulting in the death of at least one person.
 24 September: A report from the SADC Mission in Mozambique (SAMIM) reported that a Tanzanian soldier and 17 insurgents were killed in an attack on an insurgent base near Chitama, in southeastern Nangade district. On the same day, ISIS claimed responsibility for an attack in Lucuamba in which they beheaded two civilians and set fire to several houses in the village.
 25 September: A report from SAMIM stated that Mozambican killed Rajab Awadhi Ndanjile, one of the founders of the insurgency in Litingina during an attack on an insurgent base in Chitama.
 c.26 September: 4 insurgents were killed near Mucojo by Mozambican security forces.
 28 September: Insurgents attacked the village of Litiminha, Mueda district, and beheaded 7 civilians. Mozabican troops responded to the insurgent attack, killing 5 of them.
 1 October: Insurgents attacked Quitico, near Olumbe in southern Palma district. The attack killed 3 civilians, the Mozambican military surrounded the insurgents after the attack and killed all 7 of the insurgent group. On the same day, a group of 12 insurgents attacked the Tanzanian village of Kiwengulo, killing one civilian and stealing food.
 7 October: Mozambican militiamen executed 4 men in Muatide, Muidumbe district, on suspicion of being members of the insurgency.

 22 October: Insurgents attacked Lumumua near Mucojo and beheaded 2 civilians.
 24 October: ISIS militants attacked Chitama village, Nangade district killing 3 people, including two Mozambican Militiamen and a community leader.
 26 October: Mozambican forces killed at least 10 fisherman in the village of Pangane after they were caught violating a supposed ban on maritime activity north of Ilha Matemo.
 3 November: The European Union Training Mission in Mozambique is launched. It will train Quick Reaction Forces to deal with the Cabo Delgado insurgent threat.
 7 November: Insurgents attacked the village of Ntuleni, killing one person and stealing food supplies.
 9 November: Mozambican forces ambushed a group of insurgents in the forest near the village of Samora Machel, also in Nangade district, killing 3 of them. On the same day 4 insurgents were killed in a clash with Mozambican forces at Mandimba, in eastern Nangade district.
 10 November: Islamic State (IS) insurgents killed a man in the village of 5º Congresso in northern Macomia district claiming he was a spy for the Mozambican government. The insurgents were later ambushed by militiamen near Chai shortly after the attack, six insurgents and one Mozambican soldier were killed in the clash.
 12 November: IS claimed responsibility for capturing and beheading 3 Mozambican soldiers in Namatil, Mueda district.
 13 November: IS claim responsibility for killing 7 Mozambican soldiers after insurgents ambushed an army patrol in the village of Neida. On the same day, the village of Nanjaba was attacked by a group of 30 insurgents, burning 17 houses and killing 3 people. On the same day, suspected insurgents killed a taxi driver with a machete and stole his motorcycle.
 14 November: IS released photos of them beheading two 'spies' they accused of working with Mozambican security forces in Ngapa.
 16 November: IS insurgents established a new base in Nambungal after a period of fighting took place between them and Mozambican forces, resulting in the deaths of 4 Mozambican militiamen.
 18 November: Mozambican forces overran an insurgent base Ninga, in southern Nangade district, killing at least 2 insurgents. On the same day, 9 insurgents were also killed after fighting took place in Macomia district.
 21 November: Mozambican militiamen fought off an insurgent attack near Mueda town. No casualties were reported in the fighting.
 25 November: The insurgency spread to the Mozambican province of Niassa after a group of insurgents attacked the village of Gomba, killing at least one Mozambican police officer.
 27 November: IS claimed responsibility for an attack on the village of Naulala, also in Niassa province. The village was raided of its health supplies and two houses were burnt down.
 29 November: IS operatives attacked the village of Chitoio, in Macomia district, killed two civilians and then attacked the village of Chai, claiming that the Mozambican forces stationed in the village fled from their positions.
 30 November: Insurgents attacked the village of Macananje, 20 kilometers from the capital of Mecula district, Niassa province, wounding a member of the Mozambican security forces.
 3 December: IS militants attacked the village of Nova Zambezia, Macomia district, beheading one civilian that IS claimed was a Mozambican soldier.
 6 December: 4 insurgents were killed by Mozambican militiamen during a firefight in the village of Nkoe, Macomia district.
 8 December: Insurgents attacked the village of Lichengue, in the Mecula district of Niassa province, burning down several houses and killing at least one civilian. ISIS later claimed responsibility for the attack. On the same day ISIS also claimed responsibility for an attack on Chimene, that left one civilian dead.
 10 December: Insurgents attacked Kiwengulo, a village in Tanzania's Mtwara region, killing 4 civilians. Tanzanian forces responded to the attack and killed 5 insurgents. A Tanzanian military vehicle was also destroyed in the clash.
 19 December: It was reported that ISIS insurgents beheaded a Christian Pastor in the Nova Zambezia area, gave his severed head to his wife and 'ordered her to inform the authorities'.
 19 December: Mozambique's defence minister claimed Mozambican and SAMIM soldiers killed ten insurgents after storming an ISIS camp in Cabo Delgado.
 20 December: A patrol consisting of South African Special Forces and Mozambican ground troops were ambushed by ISIS east of Chai village. A number of Mozambican soldiers as well as a single South African special forces operator were killed in the attack. Several other soldiers were injured. This marked the first death of a South African special forces operator in combat since the South African Border War
 21 December: Two Mozambican militiamen were killed in an ISIS attack in an unspecified location in the Macomia region.

2022 
 2 January: Three civilians were killed after ISIS militants attacked the Christian village of Nofa Zambizia in Macomia district.
 7 January: The village of Nashi Bandi was attacked by ISIS operatives, killing two Christian Mozambican militiamen and destroying at least 30 houses. On the same day, IS also claimed responsibility for attacking the village of Ikomila, in the Mueda region, killing one Mozambican militiaman and setting fire to several buildings.
 8 January: IS claimed responsibility for an attack on the village of Alberto Chipande in the Mueda district, killing one civilian and one off-duty Mozambican militiaman.
 11 January: Insurgents killed a fisherman after attacking the island of Ilha Quilhaule off the coast of the Ibo district.
 12 January: Insurgents attacked Luneke, Nangane district, killing 3 civilians and then fleeing on a motorcycle.
 13 January: SADC announced the extension of a 3 month military offensive targeting insurgent bases in Cabo Delgado and that so far they had successfully managed to kill 31 insurgents and had confiscated several weapons in the process.
 15 January: ISIS operatives abducted 3 Mozambican militia fighters from Nova Zambezia and executed them by beheading.
 23 January: Insurgents attacked the village of Limualamuala, beheading 3 civilians and burning down several buildings.
 26 January: Insurgents attacked the village of Nova Zambezia, Macomia district, beheading one civilian.
 27 January: The village of Mitambo, in eastern Meluco district, was attacked by a group of insurgents. One civilian was beheaded by insurgents during the attack.
 28 January: The village of Iba, Meluco district, was attacked by insurgents, killing at least 6 civilians. The insurgents later left the village and began an attack on the village of Muaguide, killing another 8 civilians. IS later claimed the attack.
 29 January: Rwandan and Mozambican soldiers ambushed a group of insurgents near Naquitengue, in southern Mocimboa da Praia district, killing two of them including an insurgent leader who was identified as 'Twahili Mwidini'.
 31 January: Insurgents attacked Olumboa, a village on the coast of Macomia district, killing one civilian. IS later claimed responsibility for the attack.
 1 February: Insurgents launched an attack on the coastal villages of Ilha Matemo and Matemo. The insurgents arrived by boat and killed 3 civilians in the course of the attack. IS later claimed responsibility.
 5 February: Insurgents raided several areas between Macomia town and Pemba. In the raids, the insurgents ambushed a group of civilian hunters, killing 4 of them and stealing their food. The village of Rafique was also attacked, where one civilian was beheaded. Also on 5 February, insurgents ambush a Mozambican army patrol near Nova Zambezia, Macomia district, resulting in the deaths of 5 insurgents and one Mozambican soldier.
 7 February: Insurgents attacked the village of Namuembe, south of Nangade, killing one civilian. A group of Mozambican militiamen later ambushed the insurgents as the attack was occurring. The ensuing firefight left 7 insurgents and 4 Mozambican militiamen dead.
 6–8 February: Armed forces recaptured Nihca de Rovuma and Pundanhar villages where jihadists have set up their camps.
 10 February: An insurgent was captured by Mozambican militiamen near Namuembe, revealing the location of an insurgent camp near Nangade and that the camp was largely led by Tanzanians. The Mozambican militiamen later ambushed a group of insurgents near Nangade, killing 6 insurgents.
 6 September: Insurgents attacked a Catholic mission in Chipene, in the Diocese of Nacala, killing a Catholic nun, sister Maria de Coppi.
 7 September: Following the attack on Chipene, the same insurgents attacked nearby settlements, killing at least three Christians. 
 30 November: SAMIM claimed that over 30 insurgents and 2 soldiers were killed following a clash in Cabo Delgado which resulted in the seizure of a number of weapons.

Insurgency as a Maritime Threat 
In 2011, Northern Mozambique gained much international attention when large offshore gas fields containing up to 425 billion cubic meters of gas, were discovered. With the goal of becoming a major international player in the energy sector, Mozambique's government has prioritized the region's economic attractiveness and has sent its army to ensure the safety of planned investments. Foreign activities include a $30 billion investment of US-based company Exxon Mobil and expected $20 billion of Total Energies. While Total Energies has stated that they will pause their investment to reassess the security situation in Northern Mozambique, the EU's planned reduction in Russian gas imports has made the project more likely. 

Terrorist activity is viewed as a risk to international LNG investment, with concerns raised about the kidnapping of foreign workers. However, indigenous coastal communities and maritime facilities are also targets of violent activity: in 2021, the port town of Palma was attacked, killing dozens of civilians. Maritime infrastructure has also been targeted, with the key port of Mocimboa da Praia being seized.

Attacks on maritime infrastructure can be attributed to rising social inequality. The exploitation of the region's natural resources, including the offshore gas fields, puts the native population at risk, as they face displacement and very little profit returns to the region due to high levels of corruption. Finding its root in the precarious economic situation and the political marginalization of the native population, local conflicts have been used to radicalize young men. 

Given the increase in extreme violent activities and simultaneously in military personnel, tensions are likely to rise as the region's economic exploitation continues. This also endangers the region's maritime environment. Conflicts on the land spill over to the sea, creating an unsafe environment for offshore investments. Because Northern Mozambique is a major transnational drug trafficking hub, contested governance on land and sea facilitates maritime heroin smuggling.

The deteriorating security situation has led to various international efforts in order to support Mozambique’s maritime capabilities and ensure safety along the coast. Russia has deployed the Wagner Group, a private security organization heavily linked to the Russian government  in Northern Mozambique but failed its mission to support counter-insurgency activities and withdrew in 2020. Wagner Group was allegedly aided by the Russian fleet, though this has not been officially proven. Mozambique has formed an arrangement with Italy to train its navy, while Portugal, the former colonial power, has donated speedboats to the country. Furthermore, Mozambique and India are cooperating on marine security issues, with India assisting in the development of the country's naval infrastructure and the training of personnel. In addition, South Africa has dispatched naval patrol vessels, and Rwanda has increased its presence along the coast. Currently, the UNODC is assisting Mozambique's naval capabilities by training the country's Navy, Maritime Authority, and maritime law enforcement officers, thereby improving domain awareness and port security. However, mere capability training for law enforcement authorities is controversial, as corruption, power abuse and involvement in illicit economies is high in Mozambique’s state authorities.

Limits on media freedom
There is a lack of access to reliable information in the region due to journalists being intimidated by government and military personnel. On 5 January 2019, Mozambican authorities unlawfully detained journalist Amade Abubacar, who had reported on the insurgency. He was subsequently subjected to torture, and only released on bail after 107 days in detention.

War crimes
The rebels have committed extensive war crimes, targeting and murdering civilians on many occasions during the insurgency.

In addition, Mozambican security forces were reportedly filmed as they tortured and murdered captured rebel fighters. Amnesty International said that the videos were genuine, while Mozambique's defense ministry spokesperson Omar Saranga argued that they were probably produced by the rebels themselves, using captured uniforms to produce propaganda against the government.

See also 
 Southern African Development Community Mission in Mozambique
 List of wars involving Mozambique
 Mozambican War of Independence
 Mozambican Civil War
 Islamic terrorism
 Insurgency in the Maghreb (2002–present)
 Islamist insurgency in the Sahel
 Boko Haram (or ISWAP) insurgency
 Sinai insurgency

References

Citations

Works cited 
 
 Eric Morier-Genoud, "Why Islamist attack demands a careful response from Mozambique", The Conversation, 18 October 2017
 Eric Morier-Genoud, "Mozambique's own version of Boko Haram is tightening its deadly grip", The Conversation, 11 June 2018

Further reading 
 Bonate, Liazzat J. K. "Why the Mozambican Government's alliance with the Islamic Council of Mozambique might not end the insurgency in Cabo Delgado" Zitamar News, 14 June 2019.
 Bonate, Liazzat J. K. "The Islamic side of the Cabo Delgado crisis" Zitamar News, 20 June 2018
History Compass, 8/7, 2010, 573–593.
 Bonate, Liazzat J. K., "L’Agence des musulmans d’Afrique. Les transformations de l’islam à Pemba au Mozambique". Afrique Contemporaine, No. 231, 2009, 63–80.
 Bonate, Liazzat J. K., "Muslim Religious Leadership in Post-Colonial Mozambique." South African Historical Journal, No 60 (4), 2008, 637–654.
 Bonate, Liazzat J. K., "Between Da’wa and Development: Three Transnational Islamic Nongovernmental Organizations in Mozambique, 1980–2010". Newsletter of the Africa Research Initiative, Second Edition –March 2015, Centre for Strategic Intelligence Research, National Intelligence University, Washington DC, pp. 7–11.
 Morier-Genoud, Eric, "A Prospect of Secularization? Muslims and Political Power in Mozambique Today", Journal for Islamic Studies, Cape Town: University of Cape Town, vol.27, 2007, pp. 233–266. [French version here]
 Morier-Genoud, Eric, "L’Islam au Mozambique après l’indépendance. Histoire d’une montée en puissance", L’Afrique Politique 2002, Paris: Karthala, 2002, pp. 123–146. [Portuguese version here ]
 Morier-Genoud, Eric, "The 1996 ‘Muslim holiday’ affair. Religious competition and state mediation in contemporary Mozambique", Journal of Southern African Studies, Oxford: Taylor & Francis, vol.26, n°3, September 2000, pp. 409–27.

2017 in Mozambique
2018 in Mozambique
2019 in Mozambique
2020 in Mozambique
2021 in Mozambique
Cabo Delgado Province
Conflicts in 2017
Conflicts in 2018
Conflicts in 2019
Conflicts in 2020
Conflicts in 2021
Islam in Mozambique
Islamic terrorism in Africa
Islamic terrorist incidents in the 2010s
Conflicts in 2022
Religion-based civil wars
Separatism in Mozambique
Terrorist incidents in Africa in 2017
Terrorist incidents in Africa in 2018
Wars involving Mozambique
Wars involving Tanzania
Military operations involving Portugal